"Fields of Fire" (single version subtitled "400 Miles") is one of the biggest hits by the Scottish rock band Big Country. It was first released in the United Kingdom in 1983 as the second single from the band's debut album The Crossing.

Music video
The music video begins with a young boy playing with his toy train set. The members of the band are passengers on a train that has left the railway station and are seen playing their instruments inside their train coach. After going through a tunnel, the train is stopped because a Scotsman is playing the bagpipes on the railway line. The band then leave their carriage and follow the Scotsman to find themselves watching a First World War Battle in which the band members themselves are taking part.

Reception
The song was a big hit, introducing the band to mainstream audiences in the United States in 1984 and reaching the top ten in the UK Singles Chart. On their album review of The Crossing, Rolling Stone noted that the song was "one of the great, resounding anthems of this or any other year" and praised the "bagpipelike single-string riffs". Big Country's bassist Tony Butler has also claimed this song to be one of his favourites.  Cash Box said that "a nod to the homeland discernable in the repetition of a familiar Scottish folk theme in the guitar instrumental segments again positions this band’s offering in its own musical territory."

Chart positions

Credits
Music and lyrics: Stuart Adamson, Bruce Watson, Mark Brzezicki, Tony Butler
Production: Steve Lillywhite

Compilation album usage
The song has been included on several notable compilation albums since its release. For instance, in 1992, the track was included on the Time Life:The Rock Collection-Hot Rock release, and in 1997, the long-running The Best... Album in the World...Ever! compilation album brand included the song on their The Best Scottish Album in the World... Ever! release.

References

External links
Big Country's Official Website Retrieved May 2009

1983 singles
Big Country songs
Song recordings produced by Steve Lillywhite
Songs written by Stuart Adamson
Songs written by Mark Brzezicki
Songs written by Tony Butler (musician)
Songs written by Bruce Watson (guitarist)
1983 songs
Mercury Records singles